Gold Mountain Records was a record label based in New York. It was distributed by A&M Records between 1983 and 1985. After 1985, the distributor was MCA Records.

In 1985, the president of the label was Danny Goldberg. Goldberg founded an anti-censorship group called the Musical Majority to counter the call for rock and roll records with explicit lyrics to have warning labels.

Notable releases include Bruce Cockburn's Stealing Fire, "The Final Frontier" by Keel, and The Textones' Midnight Mission.

Gold Mountain Records changed its name in 1987 to Gold Castle Records.

See also
 List of record labels

References

American record labels
Record labels established in 1983
Record labels disestablished in 1985